LPQ or lpq may refer to:

Places
 Leiyang West railway station, Hunan China (telegraph code LPQ)
 Luang Prabang International Airport, Laos (IATA code LPQ)
 Liangping District (abbreviated: LPQ), Chongqing Municipality, Sichuan, China
 , Carthage; also known as Leptis Magna, Roman Libya, Roman Empire; the modern city of Al-Khums, Libya
 , Carthage; also known as Leptis Parva, Roman Empire

Groups, organizations, companies
 Le Pain Quotidien, an international chain of bakery restaurants 
 Liberal Party of Quebec, a provincial political party in Quebec, Canada

Other uses
 lpq a command originating in BSD's Berkeley printing system to show the current print queue in multiple architectures including Linux and Unix 
 Lpq in Bocheński notation for the default formulation of material nonimplication
 laparoscopy-to-laparotomy quotient (LPQ); see Laparoscopy

See also